The brown ridged nudibranch, Dermatobranchus sp. 4, as designated by Gosliner, 1987, is a species of nudibranch. It is a marine gastropod mollusc in the family Arminidae. As at November 2009, it remained undescribed by science.

Distribution

This species has to date only been found off South Africa, on both coasts of the Cape Peninsula, in 10–30 m of water. It appears to be endemic.

Description

The brown ridged nudibranch is a  small nudibranch, reaching 25 mm in total length. It is pale-bodied with narrow white ridges running longitudinally down its body.  Variable brown blotches run across its body with a distinct brown collar at the head area. Its pale rhinophores are oval with longitudinal ridges.

Ecology

References

Arminidae
Undescribed gastropod species